KFIA (710 kHz) is a commercial AM radio station broadcasting a Christian talk and teaching format. Licensed to Carmichael, California, the station serves the Sacramento metropolitan area.  The station is currently owned by New Inspiration Broadcasting Company, Inc. which is a part of Salem Communications.

KFIA is powered at 25,000 watts by day.  But because 710 AM is a clear channel frequency reserved for Class A stations KIRO Seattle and WOR New York City, KFIA must greatly reduce power at night to 1,000 watts.  It uses a directional antenna at all times.  The transmitter is off North Foothills Boulevard at Athens Avenue in Rocklin.  KFIA programming is also heard on 250 watt FM translator K289CT 105.7 MHz in Sacramento.

Programming
Most of KFIA's schedule is brokered programming where religious leaders pay for time on the station and may seek donations to their ministries during their shows.  Some national Christian shows heard on KFIA include Through the Bible with J. Vernon McGee, Grace to You with John MacArthur, Truth for Life with Alistair Begg, Insight for Living with Chuck Swindoll and Focus on The Family with Jim Daly. Until August 2009, it aired Bible Answer Man with Hank Hanegraff.  News updates are supplied by SRN News.

History
On January 11, 1979, the station signed on the air.  It was owned by Olympic Broadcasters and was powered at only 250 watts. KFIA has maintained the same call sign and religious format for its entire time on the air.

New Inspiration Broadcasting, a subsidiary of the Salem Media Group, acquired the station in 1995.

References

External links

 

FIA
Radio stations established in 1978
Salem Media Group properties